The tambin (also sereendu, fulannu or Fula flute) is a diagonal diatonic flute without a bell, made from a conical vine, with three finger-holes and a rectangular embouchure with two wings on either side. It is considered the national instrument of the West African Fula and is similar in its sound and quality to the Ney. The flute was used in the 2018 Marvel movie Black Panther.

References

Flutes
West African musical instruments